Pablo Daniel Genovese (born 26 July 1977 in Buenos Aires, Argentina) is an Argentine footballer.

He can play either as a centre midfielder or defensive midfielder.

Career

Vida
On 28 November 2010, Genevese decided to move at Vida after having a poor campaign with Hispano.

On 14 January 2011, Genovese made his domestic league debut in a 1-0 away win against the current champion Real España. On 23 January 2011, Genovese scored his first goal for Vida in a 5–2 win against Deportes Savio.

References

1977 births
Living people
Argentine footballers
Argentine expatriate footballers
Club Atlético Banfield footballers
Hispano players
C.D. Marathón players
C.D.S. Vida players
Expatriate footballers in Honduras
Liga Nacional de Fútbol Profesional de Honduras players
Association football midfielders
Footballers from Buenos Aires